William Merritt Steger (August 22, 1920 – June 4, 2006) was an American politician and United States district judge of the United States District Court for the Eastern District of Texas.

Education and career

Born on August 22, 1920, in Dallas, Texas, Steger received a Bachelor of Laws from the Dedman School of Law at Southern Methodist University in 1950. He was in the United States Army Air Forces as a Captain from 1942 to 1947. He was in private practice of law in Longview, Texas from 1951 to 1953. He was the United States Attorney for the Eastern District of Texas from 1953 to 1959. He was in private practice of law in Tyler, Texas from 1959 to 1970. He was the Republican candidate for State Governor of Texas in 1960. He was a Republican candidate for United States House of Representatives from Texas in 1962. He was the Chairman of the Republican Party of Texas from 1969 to 1970.

Federal judicial service

Steger was nominated by President Richard Nixon on October 7, 1970, to the United States District Court for the Eastern District of Texas, to a new seat created by 84 Stat. 294. He was confirmed by the United States Senate on November 25, 1970, and received his commission on December 1, 1970. He assumed senior status on December 31, 1987. His service was terminated on June 4, 2006, due to his death in Tyler.

Honor

The William M. Steger Federal Building and United States Courthouse was named in Steger's honor.

References

External links
 
 "William M. Steger: The Campaign for Governor of Texas, 1960," by Mike Lantz. East Texas Historical Journal, pp. 50 – 61. Fall, 2004. Vol XLII - No 2.
 The Texas House of Representatives passed a memorial resolution for Judge Steger on May 14, 2007, that contained biographical information about him, see: 
 Congressional Quarterly's Guide to U.S. Elections, Governors, 1960; U.S. House, 1962
 
 William Steger obituary, Burks Walter Tippit Funeral Directors, Tyler, Texas
 Tyler Morning Telegraph, June 5, 2006
 

1920 births
2006 deaths
Judges of the United States District Court for the Eastern District of Texas
People from Dallas
United States Army personnel of World War II
Texas Republicans
Texas Republican state chairmen
Texas lawyers
Dedman School of Law alumni
United States Army officers
United States Attorneys for the Eastern District of Texas
United States district court judges appointed by Richard Nixon
20th-century American judges